LaPoynor High School is a public high school located just outside the unincorporated community of Larue, Texas, USA and classified as a 2A school by the UIL. It is a part of the LaPoynor Independent School District located in southeastern Henderson County. After World War II, the schools in Larue and Poynor consolidated to form the LaPoynor Independent School District. In 2015, the school was rated "Met Standard" by the Texas Education Agency.

Athletics
The LaPoynor Flyers compete in these sports - 

Cross Country, Basketball, Track, Baseball & Softball

State Titles
Boys Basketball  - 
1972(B), 1973(B), 1975(B), 1985(1A), 1995(2A)
Girls Basketball - 
2002(1A/D1), 2003(1A/D1)
Boys Golf - 
2007(1A)

State Finalist
Boys Basketball  - 
1974(B), 1979(1A), 2020 (1A), 2023 (2A)
Girls Basketball - 
1983(1A), 1988(1A), 1989(1A), 2018 (1A)

References

External links
LaPoynor ISD website

Public high schools in Texas
Schools in Henderson County, Texas